Celts Campaign Sourcebook is an accessory for the 2nd edition of the Advanced Dungeons & Dragons fantasy role-playing game, published in 1992. The manual was published by TSR and written by Graeme Davis.

Contents

Publication history
The manual was published by TSR and written by Graeme Davis.

Reception
Berin Kinsman reviewed the book in a 1993 issue of White Wolf Magazine. He noted that, as a reference, other sources might be more useful, but "[a]s an AD&D supplement, this makes a fair showing". He rated it overall at a 3 out of a possible 5.

References

Dungeons & Dragons sourcebooks
Role-playing game supplements introduced in 1992